Legal Cheek is a British legal news website. It also has a careers section featuring research about law firms and barrister chambers and a large following on social media.

History
Founded by former Guardian journalist Alex Aldridge in 2011, Legal Cheek initially operated out of Aldridge's apartment in London. Aldridge has a background in law after training as a barrister.

In 2012, Legal Cheek was forced to issue an apology for using an incorrect photo in an article about a dispute between two barristers. In an interview after this had taken place, Aldridge admitted there had been a "lawsuit" and pledged to think harder about "accountability".

In 2014, Legal Cheek conducted the first ever interview with Judge Rinder, the barrister who would go on to find fame on Strictly Come Dancing.

Legal Cheek has been cited in UK media, including the BBC, The Independent  and The Telegraph.  

As of 2022, Legal Cheek has editors Tom Connelly, and Aishah Hussain - and various columnists, including Will Holmes.

Careers advice
Since its founding in 2011, Legal Cheek has become one of the largest careers advice websites in the UK. The Firms Most List and Chambers Most List, updated annually with new data, feature research about some of the UK's leading law firms and barrister chambers. Legal Cheek also regularly updates its Key Deadlines Calendar with firm and chamber specific application deadlines and events, and alerts its follower base about upcoming deadlines.  

The website also lays out the various Paths to becoming a lawyer, and offers tips for students and graduates at each stage.

Events
Legal Cheek runs numerous careers events for aspiring solicitors, both in-person and virtual, as well as in partnership with leading law firms.  

As of 2022, Legal Cheek's UK Virtual Law Fairs are some of the largest law careers events in the UK. Legal Cheek also hosts several international fairs, geared towards aspiring solicitors based in locations such as Ireland, Scotland, Hong Kong and Singapore.

References

External links
Official Website

Law blogs
British news websites
Internet properties established in 2011
British legal websites